Gary Lee Clark Jr. (born February 15, 1984) is an American musician from Austin, Texas. He is known for his fusion of blues, rock and soul music with elements of hip hop. In 2011, Clark signed with Warner Bros Records and released The Bright Lights EP. It was followed by the albums Blak and Blu (2012) and The Story of Sonny Boy Slim (2015). Throughout his career, Clark has been a prolific live performer, which has been documented in two releases: Gary Clark Jr. Live (2014) and Gary Clark Jr Live/North America (2017). He has shared the stage with Eric Clapton, Tom Petty and the Heartbreakers, B.B. King and the Rolling Stones.

In 2014, Clark was awarded a Grammy for Best Traditional R&B performance for the song "Please Come Home". His latest album, This Land, was released in 2019. In 2020, he won the Grammy Award for "Best Rock Song" and "Best Rock Performance" for the song "This Land" from his album of the same name.

Career

Early career 
Gary Clark Jr. began playing guitar at the age of 12. Born and raised in Austin, Texas, Clark played small gigs throughout his teens until he met promoter Clifford Antone, proprietor of the Austin music club Antone's. Antone's was the launch pad where Jimmie and Stevie Ray Vaughan redefined blues at the time. Soon after meeting Clifford, Clark began to perform with other musical icons, including Jimmie Vaughan. Vaughan and others in the Austin music community helped Clark along his musical path.

Clark sang on the 2010 bonus track cover of the Jackson 5's "I Want You Back" on Sheryl Crow's album 100 Miles from Memphis.

Rolling Stone declared Clark "Best Young Gun" in its April 2011, "Best of Rock" issue.

2012–2014: Collaborations, Blak and Blu, and Gary Clark Jr. Live 
In 2012 Clark recorded with Alicia Keys on two different songs in New York City. He co-wrote the song "Fire We Make" with Alicia Keys, Pop Wansel and Oak Felder for the album Girl on Fire.

On August 28, 2012, Alicia Keys revealed via Twitter that Clark's new album and major-label debut called Blak and Blu would be released on October 22, 2012. Released by Warner Records, Blak and Blu peaked at number six on the Billboard 200 album chart, and number one on the Blues Albums chart.

In 2014, Clark's first live album, Gary Clark Jr. Live, was released. A double album recorded over the course of an 18-month-tour between 2013 and 2014, Gary Clark Jr. Live received generally positive reviews from critics.

Clark worked with the Foo Fighters on the track "What Did I Do? / God as My Witness" on their 2014 album Sonic Highways recorded at KLRU-TV Studio 6A in Austin.

2015–2018: The Story of Sonny Boy Slim, Live North America 2016, and "Come Together" cover 
Gary Clark released his album The Story of Sonny Boy Slim on September 11, 2015.

Clark also had a guest appearance on Tech N9ne's 2016 album The Storm, providing the chorus for the song "No Gun Control". Clark also appeared on Childish Gambino's album "Awaken, My Love!", released that same year, performing the guitar solo on the track "The Night Me and Your Mama Met".

In 2017, Clark released his second live album, Live North America 2016.

Clark collaborated with ZZ Ward on "Ride" from the soundtrack to the 2017 Pixar film Cars 3.

Clark's cover version of the Beatles' 1969 song "Come Together", was released in early 2017. It became his first charting single, appearing on Billboards Mainstream Rock chart, where it peaked at #15. Clark's version of "Come Together" was featured in the 2017 Zack Snyder-directed superhero film Justice League.

In 2018, Clark featured on two songs on Bun B's album Return of the Trill, "Blood on the Dash" and "Gone Away" also featuring Leon Bridges.

Clark was featured on Tom Morello's album The Atlas Underground, providing vocals and guitar on the song "Where It's At Ain't What It Is."

2019: This Land 
On January 10, 2019, Clark announced the March 1, 2019, release of his new This Land album via Warner Bros. On the same day he also released the title song from the album supported by a Savanah Leaf directed music video for the song. This Land was chosen as a 'Favorite Blues Album' by AllMusic.

Live appearances 

Clark performed at the 50th Monterey Jazz Festival as part of the promotion for John Sayles' 2007 film Honeydripper.
Clark performed at the 2010 Crossroads Guitar Festival alongside B.B. King, Eric Clapton, Buddy Guy, Steve Winwood, John Mayer, Sheryl Crow, Jeff Beck, and ZZ Top. He joined Doyle Bramhall II and Sheryl Crow on stage for their performance with Eric Clapton, and also debuted several original songs.

In June 2011, Clark played at the annual Bonnaroo Music Festival in Manchester, Tennessee, at the Miller Lite On Tap Lounge. On June 10, 2012, Clark again played at Bonnaroo, and his performance was streamed live online via the Bonnaroo MusicFest Channel on YouTube.

In February 2012, Clark performed alongside blues legends at the Red, White and Blues event at the White House. The event, aired on PBS, also included B.B. King, Mick Jagger, Jeff Beck and Buddy Guy, among others. Clark played "Catfish Blues" and "In the Evening (When the Sun Goes Down)", as well as contributing to performances of "Let the Good Times Roll", "Beat Up Old Guitar", "Five Long Years" and "Sweet Home Chicago".

In June 2012, Clark guested with the Dave Matthews Band playing "Can't Stop" and "All Along the Watchtower" at dates in Virginia Beach and Indianapolis and on October 21 and 22, 2012, Clark appeared as the opening act at the Bridge School Benefit Concert, Bridge XXVI. On December 8, 2012, Clark appeared at the Rolling Stones' first US-gig of their 50th anniversary tour at the Barclay's Center in Brooklyn, to perform the Don Nix song "Going Down" with the band. On December 15, 2012, he joined them onstage again to play the same song, along with John Mayer, during the last date of the Stones' mini-tour at the Prudential Center.

On May 13, 2013, Clark opened for Eric Clapton & His Band at the LG Arena, Birmingham, England, and on June 12, 2013, Clark was the guest performer with the Rolling Stones at Boston's TD Garden.  Clark joined the Stones in playing the Freddie King tune "Going Down". On June 30, 2013, he appeared on the Avalon stage at the Glastonbury Festival. His performance was declared 'the most electric performance of the festival, knocking the legendary appearance of the Rolling Stones (the previous night) well into second place' and on October 25, 2013, he appeared on long-running British music show Later... with Jools Holland.

On February 9, 2014, Clark performed the Beatles song "While My Guitar Gently Weeps", along with Dave Grohl and Joe Walsh for The Beatles: the Night that Changed America. On February 16, 2014, Clark performed in the NBA All-Star Game Halftime Show with Trombone Shorty, Earth Wind and Fire, Doctor John, and Janelle Monáe and on May 29, 2014, Gary Clark Jr performed solo at Rock in Rio in Lisbon.  Clark performed guitar, as a guest, on an episode of the PBS cable television show Austin City Limits, with the Foo Fighters, that aired on February 7, 2015. He and the Foo Fighters were accompanied, on stage, by another guest guitarist, Jimmie Vaughan.

On May 24, 2015, Clark opened for the Rolling Stones at Petco Park in San Diego. On July 4, 2015, played as part of the lineup for the Foo Fighters 20th Anniversary show at RFK Stadium in Washington D.C. On June 8, 2016, he performed alongside Jon Batiste and Stay Human as musical guest of The Late Show with Stephen Colbert and on June 26, 2016, he performed during West Holts Stage, Glastonbury Festival, and on July 8, 2016, performed on the Preferred One Stage at the Basilica Block Party in Minneapolis.

On January 10, 2019, Clark appeared on The Late Show with Stephen Colbert, on which he performed "This Land" and "Feed the Babies". The latter he performed along with Jon Batiste and Stay Human as a "bonus track".

On February 16, 2019, Clark performed "Pearl Cadillac" and "This Land" on NBC's Saturday Night Live.

On February 28, 2019, Clark performed "This Land" on Comedy Central's The Daily Show with Trevor Noah.

On March 29, 2019, Clark invited a young fan, by the name of Jeff, onstage to perform a rendition of "Catfish Blues" at The Met in Philadelphia. The video of that performance went viral and Clark was praised in his act of generosity that many saw as bringing his career full circle by offering Jeff the same opportunities he had once been offered by his own idols.

On July 7, 2019, Clark opened for the Rolling Stones' concert at Gillette Stadium during their 2019 No Filter Tour.  Clark also provided guest vocals and guitar with the Stones during their performance of "Ride 'Em on Down."

Clark led the band (and Bruce Springsteen) at the Kennedy Center during Jon Stewart's Mark Twain Prize ceremony on April 24, 2022.

Film and television appearances 
 Clark starred alongside Danny Glover, Stacy Keach, and Charles Dutton in John Sayles' 2007 film Honeydripper.
 In 2010, Clark and his band played onscreen in an episode of the acclaimed television series Friday Night Lights.
 Clark appears with his band performing "Travis County" and "When My Train Pulls In" in the 2014 Jon Favreau film Chef.
 Clark was featured in the 2015 Don Cheadle motion picture Miles Ahead as part of Miles Davis' band.
 Clark appears playing the songs "If Trouble Was Money" and "Bright Lights" live in a club during a 2018 episode of Netflix series Marvel's Luke Cage.
 Clark portrays Arthur Crudup in the 2022 Baz Luhrmann film Elvis.

Awards and recognitions 
Kirk Watson, the Mayor of Austin, proclaimed May 3, 2001, to be Gary Clark Jr. Day. Clark was seventeen years old at the time. Clark won the Austin Music Award for Best Blues and Electric Guitarist, on three different occasions.

Clark was Spin's breakout artist for the month of November 2011.

Rolling Stone magazine ranked Clark's Bright Lights EP (named for the title track, an homage to Jimmy Reed and his song of the same name), number 40 on its list of its top 50 albums of 2011.

"Bright Lights" can be heard in the video game Max Payne 3, the premiere episode of House of Lies, as well as in the movie Think Like a Man near the end when the guys are in the bar before reconciling with their respective ladies, and "Don't Owe You a Thang" can be heard in Need for Speed: The Run

Kirk Hammett from Metallica introduced Clark onstage before his performance at the Orion Festival in Atlantic City, NJ.

While playing music festivals such as Coachella, JazzFest, Memphis Beale St., Hangout, High Sierra, Sasquatch, Mountain Jam, Wakarusa, Bonnaroo, Electric Forest, Hard Rock Calling, Newport Folk Festival, Orion Music Festival, Osheaga, Lollapalooza, and ACL Music Festival, Clark was awarded SPIN Magazine'''s Golden Corndog award for performing in more major North American Music Festivals in 2012 than any other musician on the planet.

Clark swept the 31st annual Austin Music Awards for 2012–2013, collecting eight awards, he earned the following: Band of the Year, Musician of the Year, Song of the Year – "Ain't Messin Round" (from Blak and Blu), Album of the Year – Blak and Blu, Electric Guitarist of the Year, Songwriter of the Year, Blues/Soul/Funk Artist of the Year, Male Vocalist of the Year.

In 2014 and 2015, Clark won a Blues Music Award in the 'Contemporary Blues Male Artist of the Year' category.

As of 2020, Clark has been nominated for six Grammy Awards, and has won four of them.

 Grammy Awards 

|-
|rowspan="2" align=center|2014
| "Please Come Home"
| Best Traditional R&B Performance
|
|-
| "Ain't Messin' 'Round"
| Best Rock Song
|
|-
|rowspan="4" align=center|2020  

| This Land| Best Contemporary Blues Album
|
|-
| rowspan="3"| "This Land"
| Best Rock Performance
|
|-
| Best Rock Song
|
|-
| Best Music Video
|
|-
|}

 Instruments 
Gary Clark Jr. mainly uses Epiphone Casino, both P-90 and Humbucker Gibson SG, and both Fender Stratocaster and Fender Telecaster electric guitars, as well as Epiphone Masterbilt and Gibson Hummingbird acoustic guitars. Clark has his own signature Blak & Blu Epiphone Casino which features Gibson USA made P-90 pickups.

Clark uses .011-.049 D'Addario Strings EXL 115.

Clark uses a Fender Vibro-King amp purchased from Zapata (who currently tours with him and plays rhythm guitar) paired with a Fender Princeton. He is known for extensive use of fuzz pedals, with his most frequently used pedal being the Fulltone Octafuzz, and regular use of a wah pedal.

 Charity 
Clark performed at Alicia Keys' Keep a Child Alive Black Ball benefit, in an effort to raise money for children with AIDS in Africa. The two performed the Beatles' "While My Guitar Gently Weeps" as a tribute to George Harrison.

 Personal life 
Clark married model Nicole Trunfio in 2016. They have three children. In late 2016, Clark and Trunfio purchased a 50-acre horse ranch in Kyle, Texas. A series of racist questions from a neighbor about Clark's ownership of the ranch served as inspiration for the song "This Land."

 Discography 

 Studio albums 

 Live albums 

 EPs 

Others
 2012 – Gary Clark Jr. Presents Hotwire Unlimited Raw Cuts Vol. 1 – Hotwire Unlimited/Warner Bros. – released April 30, 2012 [U.K. vinyl 45rpm]

 2013 – Gary Clark Jr. Presents Hotwire Unlimited Raw Cuts Vol. 2 – Warner Bros. – released April 21, 2013 [U.K. vinyl Side A – 33 rpm, Side B – 45rpm]

 Singles 

 Guest appearances 
 Booker T. Jones – "Austin City Blues" on Sound the Alarm (Booker T. Jones album) (2013)
 The-Dream – "Too Early" on IV Play (2013)
 Talib Kweli – "Demonology" (featuring Big K.R.I.T.) on Gravitas (2013)
 Foo Fighters – "What Did I Do? / God As My Witness" on Sonic Highways (2014)
 Tech N9ne – "No Gun Control" (featuring Krizz Kaliko) on The Storm (2016)
 Childish Gambino – "The Night Me And Your Mama Met" on "Awaken, My Love!" (2016)
 ZZ Ward – "Ride" on Cars 3 soundtrack (2017)
 Trae Tha Truth – "I'm on 3.0" (featuring T.I., Dave East, Tee Grizzley, Royce Da 5'9, Curren$y, DRAM, Snoop Dogg, Fabolous, Rick Ross, Chamillionaire, G-Eazy, Styles P, E-40 & Mark Morrison) on The Truth, Pt. 3 (2017)
 Tom Morello – "What It's At Ain't What It Is" (featuring Nico Stadi) on The Atlas Underground (2018)
 Sir Sly – "Citizen" (2020)

 Mixtapes 
2014 – Blak and Blu The Mixtape'' – presented by D-Nice – released April 30, 2014

See also

References

External links 

 
 
 
 Crossroadsguitarfestival.com

1984 births
Living people
American blues guitarists
American male guitarists
Male actors from Texas
American male film actors
American male television actors
Space rock musicians
Lead guitarists
African-American guitarists
African-American rock musicians
American blues singers
Blues rock musicians
Electric blues musicians
Texas blues musicians
Singer-songwriters from Texas
American blues singer-songwriters
Contemporary blues musicians
Soul-blues musicians
American neo soul singers
African-American male singer-songwriters
American rock guitarists
American rock singers
American rock songwriters
American contemporary R&B singers
American tenors
Grammy Award winners
Warner Records artists
Film directors from Texas
Guitarists from Texas
21st-century American guitarists
21st-century African-American male singers
Musicians from Austin, Texas
Austin High School (Austin, Texas) alumni